{{Infobox public transit
| name = VR commuter railVR:n lähiliikenneVR:s närtrafik
| image = 09.07.16 Tampere Sm4 6025 (28336283861).jpg
| imagesize = 280px
| alt = 
| caption = A Class Sm4 unit at Tampere station in July 2016 after working a Main Line regional service.
| image2 = 
| caption2 = 
| owner = 
| area served = Regions ofKanta-HämeKymenlaaksoPirkanmaaPäijät-Häme Finland
| locale = 
| transit_type = Commuter rail
| lines = 7
| line_number = 
| start = 
| end = 
| stations = 36
| chief_executive = 
| website = https://www.vr.fi/en/railway-stations-and-routes/commuter-traffic
| began_operation = 28 May 1972
| operator = VR
| marks = 
| character = Above ground
| vehicles = 50 Sm2 + 20 Sm4 + 16 Eil + 4 Eilf
| train_length = 2-8 cars
| headway = 
| system_length = 
| track_gauge = 
| ogauge = 
| minimum_radius_of_curvature = 
| el = 25 kV / 50 Hz
| average_speed = 
| top_speed = 160 km/h
| map = 
| map_state = show
| map_name = 
| ridership = 
| osm_id = 
}}

VR commuter rail is a Finnish commuter rail system operated by VR – the national railway operator of Finland – under a public service obligation agreement with the Ministry of Transport and Communications of Finland. The operations are planned in trilateral co-operation between the ministry, the operator and various regional transport authorities.

VR commuter rail consists of seven alphabetically identified services on six different railway lines. Four of these services terminate at Helsinki, thus serving multiple Helsinki commuter rail stations along their routes. The system serves five regions of southern Finland which in total account for approximately half of the entire population of the country. Major cities and towns served include Tampere, Hämeenlinna, Lahti, Kouvola and Kotka.

 Services 
 Limited-stop train from Helsinki to HämeenlinnaA single return service operated on weekdays only, established in 2016. The D train departs from Hämeenlinna each weekday morning and returns from Helsinki in the afternoon. At a total travel time of 1 hour and 15 minutes, it is the Main Line's fastest commuter service, calling only at eight stations.

 Stopping train from Riihimäki to LahtiAn hourly service operated daily between the Main Line and the Lahti Line, the G train came into existence in 2017, replacing a two-hourly regional connection along the same route.

 Stopping train from Nokia to Tampere, on certain departures to ToijalaA weekday service in Greater Tampere and the surrounding region of Pirkanmaa, calling at all stations. Since its inception in 2019, the M train has consisted of two legs which meet each other at Tampere Central. As of 2022, the western leg towards Nokia has had hourly service, with every other departure continuing to the southern leg towards Toijala. In the southern direction, the M train is essentially a supplementary service to the two-hourly R train with identical stops, integrated timetables and shared rolling stock.

 Stopping train from Kotka Port to Kouvola and from Kouvola to LahtiA daily service calling at all stations, the O train is a key connection between major cities and towns in the region of Kymenlaakso. It was instated in 2022 by merging VR's remaining regional services on the Saint Petersburg Line and the Kotka Line into a joint commuter service. Although the two legs share a common letter designation, the timetables remained nonsymmetrical and only three weekday departures run directly through the entire route, with services otherwise terminating at Kouvola.

 Limited-stop train from Helsinki to Riihimäki, on certain departures to Tampere or NokiaThe main commuter service of the Main Line with a half-hourly headway throughout the week. The R train only calls only at two major interchanges before Kerava, but at every station thereafter. The service has three different termini in the north; most trains terminate at Riihimäki but, departures extend to Tampere Central every two hours. There are also supplemental service between Riihimäki and Tampere, of which all but one extend to Nokia. The Helsinki-Tampere service is the longest on the entire VR commuter rail network, spanning 206 km and taking 2 hours and 15 minutes to complete.

 Stopping train from Helsinki to RiihimäkiA night service calling at all stations. As of 2022, the T train has three late-hour departures on weekdays and runs hourly through the night on weekends. Outside of the Helsinki commuter rail operating region, it is the only regular night time commuter rail service in Finland.

 Limited-stop train from Helsinki to Lahti, on certain departures to Kouvola''

An hourly service between Helsinki and Lahti, the Z train was launched in 2006 as the Lahti Line opened. Like the R train, it only calls at two major interchanges before Kerava, after which the two lines separate from each other. Certain peak and fringe hours departures continue up to Kouvola, mostly on weekdays, supplementing the O train on the Lahti-Kouvola section of the Saint Petersburg Line.

Tickets 
It is worth noting that all tickets for any Finnish passenger trains must be purchased in advance, with the exception of the Tampere region where platform validators are used. Rail transport in Finland works on a proof-of-payment system. Failing to present a valid ticket (or proof of one's right to a discount when applicable) is considered fare evasion; getting caught doing it results in a penalty fare of 80 euros across the system, including in the HSL and Nysse regions.

Within the VR region 
Unlike the dynamic ticket pricing on VR's long-distance trains, commuter rail tickets have set prices. The prices are determined separately for each combination of stations – alphabetical zones have been discontinued on VR commuter rail as the network has grown massively over the years. Certain discounts are available for military conscripts, alternative servants, children, pensioners and students.

Within Greater Helsinki 
HSL, the Helsinki regional transport authority, holds authority over issuing and inspecting tickets on all commuter trains passing through its operating region. VR tickets are necessary for journeys to and from the HSL region, whereas only HSL tickets are sold for journeys within it. Unlike in Greater Tampere, HSL tickets are not valid on long-distance trains within the HSL region.

Within Greater Tampere 
Nysse, the Tampere regional transport authority, does not hold a similar position of authority akin to the HSL. Despite that, tickets issued by Nysse are valid on all commuter and long-distance services between Nokia and Lempäälä, as well as on regional trains up until the town of Orivesi. Alongside VR conductors, ticket inspectors employed by the city of Tampere have the right to inspect tickets on and off commuter trains, as Nysse tickets have to be pre-validated on station platforms. VR and Nysse also collaborate in regard to the scheduling of each other's services.

In other regions 
In Kymenlaakso, VR co-operates with the cities of Kouvola and Kotka by offering a mobile ticket which is valid both on local buses and on commuter trains between Koria and Kotka Port. Regular bus tickets or passes issued in said cities are not valid on VR commuter rail, though.

As of 2022, VR does not co-operate or collaborate with the regional transport authorities of Kanta-Häme or Päijät-Häme.

See also 

 Helsinki commuter rail

References

External links 

 

Rail transport in Finland